Strofi (Greek: Στροφή) may refer to:

Strofi (literature), a work of Greek author Giorgos Seferis
Strofi, Rhodope, a village in the eastern part of the Rhodope regional unit, Greece